The Mahoré People's Movement is a political party in the French overseas department of Mayotte, established in 1963. In the last elections for the General Council, on 21 and 28 March 2004, the party won 1.2% of the popular vote, and 1 out of 19 seats.

Political parties in Mayotte
1963 establishments in Mayotte